Phajol Moolsan (born September 13, 1968) is a Thai boxer. At the 1988 Summer Olympics he won a bronze medal in the men's Bantamweight category, together with Jorge Julio Rocha of Colombia.

In Muay thai his name is Put Keitlansang.

Olympic results 
1st round bye
Defeated Marcus Priaulx (Australia) 5-0
Defeated Abraham Torres (Venezuela) 3-2
Defeated Nyamaagiin Altankhuyag (Mongolia) 5-0
Lost to Kennedy McKinney (United States) RSC 1

References

1968 births
Living people
Phajol Moolsan
Boxers at the 1988 Summer Olympics
Phajol Moolsan
Olympic medalists in boxing
Phajol Moolsan
Phajol Moolsan
Medalists at the 1988 Summer Olympics
Bantamweight boxers
Phajol Moolsan
Phajol Moolsan